Michael Clement Lapage (15 November 1923 – 20 July 2018) was an English missionary and rower who competed for Great Britain in the 1948 Summer Olympics.

Biography
Lapage was born at Shaftesbury, Dorset, the son of Reginald H. Lapage, vicar of Shaftesbury, and his wife Dora Ehlvers. He was educated at Monkton Combe School where he was a contemporary of fellow Olympic rower Alfred Mellows. He gained a position as a reader of geography at Selwyn College of the University of Cambridge but did not manage to make the university's rowing team as World War II intervened. Lapage saw service as a Fleet Air Arm pilot in the Pacific during the war. Coming close to being shot down had a lasting impact on him.

After the war Lapage was back at the University of Cambridge and was a member of the winning university's boat in the 1948 Boat Race. Most of that crew then won the silver medal rowing at the 1948 Summer Olympics in the men's eight at the 1948 London Olympics. The English athletes were still on rations at the time and Lapage believed that the winning Americans, who had ready access to meat, were at an advantage. At the 1950 British Empire Games he won the bronze medal as part of the English boat in the men's eight competition.

In the late 1950s, Lapage became a Christian missionary due to his upbringing and his near death experience during the war. He was ordained in Kenya in 1961. On 19 May 2012 he carried the Olympic torch in the relay for the 2012 Olympic Games, in St Austell, Cornwall.

Lapage died on 20 July 2018.

See also
List of Cambridge University Boat Race crews
Rowing at the 1948 Summer Olympics

References

1923 births
2018 deaths
English male rowers
Cambridge University Boat Club rowers
Olympic rowers of Great Britain
Rowers at the 1948 Summer Olympics
Olympic silver medallists for Great Britain
Olympic medalists in rowing
Rowers at the 1950 British Empire Games
Commonwealth Games bronze medallists for England
People educated at Monkton Combe School
English Protestant missionaries
Medalists at the 1948 Summer Olympics
Commonwealth Games medallists in rowing
Protestant missionaries in Kenya
Fleet Air Arm personnel of World War II
Fleet Air Arm aviators
People from Shaftesbury
Sportspeople from Dorset
Medallists at the 1950 British Empire Games